Karen Hagemann (born December 17, 1955) is a German-American historian. She holds the James G. Kenan Distinguished Professor chair at the University of North Carolina at Chapel Hill. Her research focuses on Modern German, European and Transatlantic history, the history of military and war and women’s and gender history.

She studied History, German Language and Literature, and Educational Sciences at the  University of Hamburg, where she got her Dr. phil in 1989. From 1989 to 2003 she taught German and European history and women’s and gender history at the Berlin Institute of Technology, where she attained her Habilitation in 2000. After visiting professorships at the TU Berlin, the University of Trier and the University of Toronto, she was from 2003 to 2005 Professor of History und Co-director of the Centre for Border Studies  at the University of Glamorgan, Wales. Since 2005 she is the James G. Kenan Distinguished Professor of History at the University of North Carolina at Chapel Hill.

Her several fellowships and grants include: 1991 - Fellowship of the Swedish Collegium for Advanced Studies in the Social Sciences (SCASSS) in Uppsala; 2000/01 - Membership of the School of Historical Studies at the Institute for Advanced Study in Princeton; 2004 - Senior Fellowship at the  Berlin Social Science Center (WZB); 2015 - German Transatlantic Program Berlin Prize Fellowship of the American Academy Berlin. Her research was supported by the Studienstiftung des deutschen Volkes, the Heinrich Böckler Foundation, the German Research Foundation, the Gerda Henkel Foundation, the Volkswagen Foundation, the Federal Ministry of Research and Education and the Arts and Humanities Research Council.

Selected publications
 Revisiting Prussia’s Wars Against Napoleon: History, Culture, and Memory. Cambridge and New York, Cambridge University Press, 2015, 
 "Mannlicher Muth und Teutsche Ehre“. Nation, Militär und Geschlecht zur Zeit der Antinapoleonischen Kriege Preußens. Schöningh, Paderborn 2002,  (Krieg in der Geschichte. Bd. 8).
 Frauenalltag und Männerpolitik. Alltagsleben und gesellschaftliches Handeln von Arbeiterfrauen in der Weimarer Republik. J.H.W. Dietz, Bonn 1990, .
 with Jan Kolossa, Gleiche Rechte – Gleiche Pflichten? Der Frauenkampf für „staatsbürgerliche” Gleichberechtigung. Ein Bilder-Lese-Buch zu Frauenalltag und Frauenbewegung in Hamburg. VSA, Hamburg 1990, .

As editor (English only)
 with Stefan Dudink and Sonya O. Rose, The Oxford Handbook of Gender, War, and the Western World since 1600. Oxford University Press, New York, 2020.
 with Donna Harsch and Friederike Brühöfener, Gendering Post-1945 History: Entanglements. Berghahn Books, Oxford and New York, 2019.
 with Sonya Michel, Gender and the long Postwar: Reconsiderations of the United States and the Two Germanys, 1945-1989. Johns Hopkins University Press, Baltimore and Washington DC, 2014.
 with Konrad H. Jarausch and Cristina Allemann-Ghionda, Children, Families and States: Time Policies of Child Care, Preschool and Primary Schooling in Europe. Berghahn Books, Oxford and New York, 2011, paperback edition 2013.
 with Alan Forrest and Étienne François, War Memories: The Revolutionary and Napoleonic Wars in Modern European Culture. Palgrave Macmillan, Basingstoke, 2012, paperback edition 2013.
 with Gisela Mettele and Jane Rendall, Gender, War, and Politics: Transatlantic Perspectives, 1775–1830. Palgrave, Houndsmills und Basingstoke 2010, paperback edition 2013.
 with Alan Forrest and Jane Rendall, Soldiers, Citizens and Civilians: Experiences and Perceptions of the French Wars, 1790–1820. Palgrave, Houndsmills und Basingstoke 2009.
 with Sonya Michel and Gunilla Budde, Civil Society and Gender Justice: Historical and Comparative Perspectives. Berghahn, Oxford und New York 2008, paperback edition 2011.
 with Jean Quataert, Gendering Modern German History: Rewriting Historiography. Berghahn Books, Oxford and New York, 2007, paperback 2010 (in German: 2008).
 with Stefan Dudink and Anna Clark, Representing Masculinity: Citizenship in Modern Western Culture. Palgrave, Houndsmills und Basingstoke 2007.
 with Stefan Dudink and John Tosh, Masculinities in Politics and War: Gendering Modern History. Manchester UP, Manchester und New York 2004.
 with Stefanie Schüler-Springorum, Home/Front: The Military, War and Gender in Twentieth-Century Germany. Berg Publishers, Oxford and New York, 2002 (in German: 2002).
 with Ida Blom and Catherine Hall, Gendered Nations: Nationalisms and Gender Order in the Long Nineteenth Century. Berg Publishers, Oxford und New York 2000.

External links

  Faculty page from UNC at Chapel Hill
 Personal website

 

1955 births
German military historians
German expatriates in the United States
Historians of Germany
Living people
Writers from Hamburg
University of Hamburg alumni
Technical University of Berlin alumni
University of North Carolina at Chapel Hill faculty
German women historians